Osnat Shurer is an Israel-born film producer, best known as the producers of the films Raya and the Last Dragon and Moana. Shurer first joined Walt Disney Animation Studios in 2012 as VP of Development, working with filmmakers to move features and shorts through the creative process. 

As producer, Shurer helps manage her films through story, script, music, and casting and leads the productions’ partnerships with publicity, marketing, and consumer products. Shurer also created the Oceanic Story Trust (Moana) and the Southeast Asia Story Trust (Raya and the Last Dragon) – teams of Pacific Island and Southeast Asia consultants with whom production collaborated closely throughout the making of both films.

Previously, Shurer served as the Executive Producer of the shorts group at Pixar, responsible for Pixar's short films. While at Pixar, Shurer produced or executive produced a host of hit shorts, including the Oscar®-nominated films LIFTED (2006), ONE MAN BAND (2005) and BOUNDIN’ (2003). 

Shurer’s duties at Pixar also included creating an in-house documentary team to produce DVD content, overseeing the development of theme park attractions, and developing and producing video shorts like JACK-JACK ATTACK, THE ADVENTURES OF MR. INCREDIBLE, and EXPLORING THE REEF WITH JEAN-MICHAEL COSTEAU with visionary directors Brad Bird and Andrew Stanton.

At Pixar, Shurer was also responsible for helping to create several cutting-edge multi-media shows, including MoMA's Pixar: 20 Years of Animation, which opened in 2006 and continues to travel the world. It features Artscape, an immersive widescreen projection space that provides viewers with a unique digital artistic experience, and Zoetrope, a 3D dynamic installation using pre-cinema tech – dimensional character sculptures to simulate continuous motion.

Early life
Prior to joining Pixar in 2002, Shurer produced and directed film and television in various mediums - live action, animation, live television, theater, and various interactive presentations for museums. She worked on documentaries throughout the world, in such places as India, China, Tibet, Japan, Africa and Europe, with international directors such Michelangelo Antonioni and Alfonso Cuarón.

As the child of an airline executive, Shurer grew up in many parts of the world. She received a degree in film from New York University in 1983. She resides in California.

Charity work
Shurer, whose father suffered from Alzheimer's disease, is a supporter of ARTSzheimer's project.

Filmography 
 Raya and the Last Dragon (2021) (producer)
 Moana (2016) (producer)
 Lifted (2006) (executive producer)
 One Man Band (2005) (producer)
 Mr. Incredible and Pals (2005) (Executive producer)
 Vowellett - An Essay by Sarah Vowell (2005) (director, producer)
 Jack-Jack Attack (2005) (producer)
 Boundin' (2003) (producer)
 Exploring the Reef with Jean-Michel Cousteau  (2003) (producer)

See also
 Sarah Vowell
 The Incredibles - DVD extras and Easter eggs

References

External links
 

Living people
Pixar people
Walt Disney Animation Studios people
Year of birth missing (living people)